Old Finnish Lutheran Church is a historic church in Sinking Gardens on E. Main Street in Lead, South Dakota.  It was built in 1907 and was added to the National Register in 1985.

It was built in 1891 by John Niemi and John Saari.  One of the church's members painted "an unusual altar painting" during 1905–1907.

It was moved in 1963 across the street to its current location, the Sinking Gardens, an area of subsidence facing onto Lead's Main Street.

References

Finnish-American culture in South Dakota
Lutheran churches in South Dakota
Churches on the National Register of Historic Places in South Dakota
Churches completed in 1907
Churches in Lawrence County, South Dakota
National Register of Historic Places in Lawrence County, South Dakota